Sir John Ramsay  (1862–1942) was an administrator in British India, he served as the Chief Commissioner of Balochistan five times.

References

1862 births
1942 deaths
Chief Commissioners of Baluchistan
Knights Commander of the Order of the Star of India
Companions of the Order of the Indian Empire
Cheshire Regiment officers
Indian Political Service officers